Claude J. "Jump" Hunt (August 11, 1886 – February 19, 1962) was an American football and basketball coach and college athletics administrator. He served as the head football coach at Hillsdale College (1911–1912), Carleton College (1913–1916, 1920–1930), and the University of Washington (1917, 1919), compiling a career college football record of 87–30–6.

From 1913 to 1916, Hunt's Carleton football teams were undefeated, allowing only three touchdowns and outscoring opponents 1,196 to 20. In 1916, Carleton traveled to Chicago and beat the Chicago Maroons 7–0 in a shocking upset. Coached by Amos Alonzo Stagg, Chicago was a member of the Western Conference at the time.

Hunt was also the head basketball coach at Hillsdale from 1910 to 1913, at Carleton from 1913 to 1917, and at Washington from 1917 to 1919, tallying a career college basketball mark of 69–39. He played college football at DePauw University, where he was an all-conference guard, graduating in 1911.

Head coaching record

Football

References

External links
 Claude J. Hunt at College Football at Sports-Reference.com
 Claude J. Hunt at College Basketball at Sports-Reference.com
 

1886 births
1962 deaths
American football guards
Carleton Knights athletic directors
Carleton Knights football coaches
Carleton Knights men's basketball coaches
DePauw Tigers football players
Hillsdale Chargers athletic directors
Hillsdale Chargers baseball coaches
Hillsdale Chargers football coaches
Hillsdale Chargers men's basketball coaches
Washington Huskies athletic directors
Washington Huskies football coaches
Washington Huskies men's basketball coaches
People from Mattoon, Illinois
Coaches of American football from Illinois
Players of American football from Illinois
Baseball coaches from Illinois
Basketball coaches from Illinois